Halothamnus is a genus in the subfamily Salsoloideae of the family Amaranthaceae (s.l., now including Chenopodiaceae). The scientific name means saltbush, from the Greek ἅλς (hals) "salt" and θαμνος (thamnos) "bush". This refers either to salty habitats or to the accumulation of salt in the plants. The genus is distributed from Southwest and Central Asia to the Arabian peninsula and East Africa.

Description 
Most species of Halothamnus are small shrubs or sub-shrubs, two species are annuals. The alternate leaves are sitting without basal narrowing at the branches. They are simple, entire, half-terete or flat and slightly fleshy (succulent).

The bisexual inconspicuous flowers are sitting solitary in the axil of a green bract and two green bracteoles. The five free tepals are green with membranous margins above a transverse line and colourless below. Five stamens arise from a cup-like structure (hypogynous disc) at the base of the flower. One ovary is formed by two carpels, with a thick pistil, and two stigmas.

The one-seeded, horizontally flattened fruit keeps being enclosed by the hardening perianth. Wings develop from the transverse zone at the outer side of the tepals. Below the wings, the perianth forms a thick and lignified tube with a widened base. Its bottom side has five pits arranged in a ring, surrounded by a rim. These fruit characteristics are essential for the genus Halothamnus.

The pollen grains are nearly ball-shaped, 18-38 µm in diameter, with 12-29 pores scattered all over the surface (pantoporate), just like it is typically for the goosefoot-family. The species differ from each other in pollen diameter and number of pores, the southern species with the smallest and the northern species with the largest pollen grains.

Pollination and dissemination 
In all species the stamens blossom first, and the stigmas unfold later (protandry). Halothamnus subaphyllus was proved to be pollinated by insects (entomophily). There are no observations for the other species, but they are considered to be pollinated by insects, too.

The fruits enclosed by the hardened perianth are dispersed by the wind (anemochory), lifted up by their wings up to 20 mm in diameter.

Distribution 

The distribution of the genus extends from the Caucasus mountains and Kazakhstan through Central Asia, Southwest Asia southward to Somalia. The westernmost localities are at the Sinai Peninsula, the easternmost in Dzungaria in China. Most species occur in Iran, Afghanistan, and southern Central Asia. All species grow in dry habitats of deserts and semideserts from 0–2800 m above sea-level. They live on rocky, clayish, or sandy soils; many species tolerate saline conditions.

Photosynthesis pathway 
All species of Halothamnus show leaf anatomy with Kranz arrangement of the Salsola-type. Physiological investigations confirmed that they are all C4-plants.

Economic importance 

Some species of Halothamnus are important grazing plants for camels, sheep and goats, and are therefore used for the recultivation of pasture, for example Halothamnus subaphyllus, Halothamnus auriculus and Halothamnus glaucus. Halothamnus subaphyllus is planted for the stabilisation of mobile sands and for the production of the medically used alkaloid Salsolin. Halothamnus somalensis is used as medicinal plant against parasitic worms. In former times Halothamnus subaphyllus and Halothamnus glaucus were used to extract potash for making soap.

Systematics 

The genus Halothamnus belongs to the subfamily Salsoloideae within the family Amaranthaceae, (formerly Chenopodiaceae). It is grouped to Tribus Salsoleae, Subtribus Sodinae, and is closely related to genus Salsola.

The genus Halothamnus was first described in 1845 by Hippolyte François Jaubert and Édouard Spach (in Illustrationes Plantarum Orientalium, 2, 50, pl. 136). The type of the genus is Halothamnus bottae, at that time the only species. In 1981, Victor Petrovič Botschantzev included the genus Aellenia here and enlarged Halothamnus to 25 species. After a revision by Gabriele Kothe-Heinrich (1993), the genus is classified into 2 sections with 21 accepted species:

Sect. Pungentifolia Kothe-Heinr.
 Halothamnus beckettii  Botsch.
Sect. Halothamnus
 Halothamnus somalensis  (N.E.Br.) Botsch.
 Halothamnus bottae  Jaub. & Spach - with 2 subspecies
 Halothamnus iranicus  Botsch.
 Halothamnus hierochunticus  (Bornm.) Botsch.
 Halothamnus iliensis  (Lipsky) Botsch.
 Halothamnus auriculus  (Moq.) Botsch. - with 2 subspecies
 Halothamnus kermanensis  Kothe-Heinr.
 Halothamnus afghanicus  Kothe-Heinr.
 Halothamnus lancifolius  (Boiss.) Kothe-Heinr.
 Halothamnus cinerascens  (Moq.) Kothe-Heinr. - with 2 subspecies
 Halothamnus glaucus  (M.Bieb.) Botsch. - with 3 subspecies
 Halothamnus bamianicus  (Gilli) Botsch.
 Halothamnus schurobi  (Botsch.)
 Halothamnus turcomanicus  Botsch.
 Halothamnus ferganensis  Botsch.
 Halothamnus sistanicus  (De Marco & Dinelli) Kothe-Heinr.
 Halothamnus oxianus  Botsch.
 Halothamnus seravschanicus  Botsch.
 Halothamnus iraqensis  Botsch.
 Halothamnus subaphyllus  (C.Meyer) Botsch. - with 3 subspecies

References 
 Gabriele Kothe-Heinrich: Revision der Gattung Halothamnus (Chenopodiaceae). Bibliotheca Botanica Bd. 143, Schweizerbart, Stuttgart 1993,  (German)
 Gabriele Kothe-Heinrich: Halothamnus. In: Karl Heinz Rechinger et al. (Edit.): Flora Iranica 172, Chenopodiaceae: 255-289 - Graz: Akad. Druck 1997,

External links 

 Schweizerbart Bibliotheca Botanica Bd. 143 Webpage
  Digital herbarium specimens from Herbarium Berlin
 
 Halothamnus Jaub. & Spach at Tropicos

 
Amaranthaceae genera